Pitcairnia echinata is a plant species in the genus Pitcairnia. This species is native to Venezuela.

References

echinata
Flora of Venezuela